Pieretti is an Italian surname. Notable people with the surname include:

Alfredo Wiechers Pieretti (1881–1964), Puerto Rican architect
Marcelo Pieretti (born 1970), Argentine rower
Marino Pieretti (1920–1981), Italian baseball player

See also
Industria Cartaria Pieretti

Italian-language surnames